Jermaine Lamarr Cole (born January 28, 1985) is an American rapper and record producer. Born on a military base in Germany and raised in Fayetteville, North Carolina, Cole initially gained recognition as a rapper following the release of his debut mixtape, The Come Up, in early 2007. Intent on further pursuing a musical career, he went on to release two additional mixtapes, The Warm Up (2009) and Friday Night Lights (2010) both to critical acclaim, after signing to Jay-Z's Roc Nation imprint in 2009.

Cole released his debut studio album, Cole World: The Sideline Story, in 2011. It debuted at number one on the US Billboard 200. His next album, Born Sinner (2013), also topped the Billboard 200. Moving into more conscious themes, 2014 Forest Hills Drive (2014) topped the Billboard 200 and earned Cole a Best Rap Album nomination at the 2015 Grammy Awards. His jazz influenced fourth album, 4 Your Eyez Only (2016), debuted at number one on the Billboard 200. Cole's fifth album, KOD (2018), became his fifth number-one album on the Billboard 200 and featured a then-record six simultaneous top twenty hits on the Billboard Hot 100, tying with the Beatles. His sixth studio album, The Off-Season, which earned him his sixth number-one album, was released on May 14, 2021.

Self-taught on piano, Cole also acts as a producer alongside his rap career, producing singles for artists such as Kendrick Lamar and Janet Jackson, as well as handling the majority of the production in his own projects. He has also developed other ventures, including Dreamville Records, as well as a non-profit organization called the Dreamville Foundation. Dreamville's compilation album Revenge of the Dreamers III (2019) debuted at number one on the Billboard 200 and was nominated for Best Rap Album at the 2020 Grammy Awards. In January 2015, Cole decided to house single mothers rent-free at his childhood home in Fayetteville, North Carolina.

Cole has won a Grammy Award for Best Rap Song, a Billboard Music Award for Top Rap Album, three Soul Train Music Awards, and 8 BET Hip Hop Awards. All five of his albums have been certified platinum by the Recording Industry Association of America (RIAA), as well as Revenge of the Dreamers III.

Early life
Jermaine Lamarr Cole was born on January 28, 1985, at an American military base in Frankfurt, West Germany. His father is an African American veteran, who served in the U.S. Army, and his mother, Kay, is a European American who was a postal worker for the United States Postal Service. Cole's father later abandoned the family during his youth. At the age of eight months his mother moved with him and his older brother Zach to the United States, to Fayetteville, North Carolina. Cole grew up in a multi-ethnic environment, and when asked about how closely his ethnicity impacts him, Cole commented, "I can identify with white people, because I know my mother, her side of the family, who I love. But at the end of the day, [I've] never felt white. I can identify [with white people] but never have I felt like I'm one of them. I identify more with what I look like, because that's how I got treated [but] not necessarily in a negative way". During his youth, Cole expressed an affinity for basketball and music, and served as a first-chair violinist for the Terry Sanford Orchestra until 2003.

Cole began rapping at the age of twelve, and saw it as an ideal profession in 2000, when his mother purchased an ASR-X musical sampler as a Christmas gift. During this period, Cole heightened emphasis on improving his production skills, later beginning initial production under the pseudonym Therapist. Cole later collaborated with local group Bomm Sheltuh, rapping and producing as a member of the group.

Cole can be seen in the crowd of the 2006 documentary Dave Chappelle's Block Party.

Upon graduating high school with a 4.2 GPA, Cole decided that his chances of securing a recording contract would be better in New York City. He moved there and accepted a scholarship to St. John's University. Initially majoring in computer science, Cole later switched to communications after witnessing the life of a lonely computer science professor. At the college, Cole was the president of Haraya, a pan-African student coalition. He graduated magna cum laude in 2007, with a 3.8 GPA. Despite graduating, Cole would officially receive his degree during a homecoming concert in 2015, revealing that he had owed money for a library book, causing the university to hold back from granting him his degree.

Cole later worked in various part-time jobs in Fayetteville, including a working ad salesman for a newspaper, a bill collector, a file clerk, and a kangaroo mascot at a skate rink.

Musical career

1999–2008: Early work and initial mixtapes

After becoming musically inspired by Canibus, Nas, Tupac and Eminem, Cole and his cousin worked on developing their basic understanding of rhyming and wordplay. As well as this, they began to learn how to interpolate storytelling within their lyrics. By 14, Cole had various notebooks filled with song ideas, however, was unable to produce beats further than sampling. Cole's mother later purchased him the Roland TR-808 drum machine in order to further Cole's understanding of production. Over the next three years, he began posting songs on various internet forums under the moniker Blaza, but later switched to the name Therapist.

Cole later expanded his production to create an entire CD's worth of instrumentals, and traveled to Roc the Mic Studio, hoping to play it for Jay Z while he was in recording sessions for American Gangster. Cole waited for over three hours, before being dismissed by Jay Z. Cole later used the CD as the backdrop for his debut mixtape, The Come Up.

2009–2010: Mixtapes and Roc Nation signing 

J. Cole released his second mixtape, The Warm Up, on June 15, 2009, to positive reviews. Cole appeared on Jay Z's album The Blueprint 3 (2009), on the track "A Star Is Born." He is featured on both Wale's debut album, Attention Deficit (2009) and mixtape Back to the Feature (2009), respectively. In January 2010, Cole, along with label mate Jay Electronica and Mos Def appeared on Talib Kweli and Hi-Tek's single, "Just Begun" for the follow-up of Reflection Eternal's album Train of Thought (2000), titled Revolutions Per Minute (2010). Cole also appeared on B.o.B's mixtape May 25 (2010), on the song "Gladiators", produced by The Alchemist.

In early 2010, Cole was chosen as one of Beyond Race magazine's "50 Great Breakthrough Artists," he ranked 49, resulting in the cover story of the publication's #11 issue, as well as a Q&A for the magazine's site. He was also featured in XXL Magazine's 2010 version of the Top Ten Freshmen, a yearly publication focusing on new rappers. Cole began a college tour from March 19, 2010, to April 30, 2010, concluding in New Brunswick, NJ at Rutgers University's annual Rutgersfest. The tour also featured a stop at Syracuse University for a show with fellow rapper, Wiz Khalifa. On March 31, he performed a new song titled "Who Dat" and released the song as a single on April 30, 2010. Cole was also featured on Young Chris' song "Still The Hottest" as well as Miguel's debut single "All I Want Is You." Additionally, Cole was featured on a track titled "We On", a song that failed to make the final track list for DJ Khaled's Victory LP.

To celebrate the anniversary of the release of The Warm Up mixtape, J. Cole released a freestyle entitled "The Last Stretch" on June 15, 2010. On June 21 of that year, J. Cole premiered the music video to his first single "Who Dat" on the BET program 106 & Park. In August 2010, Cole was awarded the UMA Male Artist of the Year thanks to his heralded The Warm Up mixtape and a high-profile deal with Jay Z's label Roc Nation at the 2010 Underground Music Awards. In a July 2010 interview, J. Cole revealed three songs that would appear on his debut album: "Dreams", "Won't Be Long", and "Never Told", which was produced by No I.D. On October 30, 2010, a demo titled "I'm Coming Home" was leaked onto the internet. Cole recorded the song as a reference track for Diddy, which later became "Coming Home" off Last Train to Paris (2010). On November 12, 2010, J. Cole released his third official mixtape titled Friday Night Lights. The tape included features from Drake, Wale, and Omen with most of the production being handled by Cole himself.

2011–2012: Cole World: The Sideline Story 

Cole served as a supporting act for Drake on the Light Dreams and Nightmares UK Tour, from January 5–21, 2011. In April 2011, "HiiiPoWeR", a song Cole produced for Kendrick Lamar's Section.80 (2011) was released. The single was the first of many collaborations to come from the two. On May 22, 2011, Cole released a song entitled "Return of Simba," the third in the "Simba" series of songs, following "Simba" and "Grown Simba." Cole purposely avoided releasing his debut album's title for fear of inconsistency, only announcing that Jay-Z would be featured on his debut album. Cole then released his follow-up single to "Who Dat", the album's lead single, "Work Out" on June 15, 2011, in honor of the second anniversary of his highly acclaimed mixtape The Warm Up. The song, produced by Cole himself, samples "The New Workout Plan" by Kanye West and interpolates "Straight Up" by Paula Abdul. The song later became a hit single, topping several music charts.

On July 31, Cole took to Twitter to announce Any Given Sunday, reminiscent of Kanye West's G.O.O.D. Fridays, a weekly free music giveaway. Cole wrote "Every Sunday til the album drops I'll be back with something. Maybe just 1 song, maybe a video, depending on how I'm feeling." For the 3rd installment of the series, Cole took to Ustream to update fans about the album and play a select few tracks that didn't make the final track list. On August 15, the music video for "Work Out" premiered on YouTube, Vevo, and 106 & Park. On August 22, Cole released his debut album's cover art, designed by Alex Haldi for Bestest Asbestos, whom Cole recorded a song for, titled "Killers", for Haldi's mixtape The Glorification of Gangster. For the fourth installment on August 29, he released his debut album's track list, once again through Twitter.

On August 30, after an unfinished version had previously leaked, "Can't Get Enough" featuring R&B singer Trey Songz was released as the album's second single. While in Barbados for his last performance as the official opening act for Rihanna's Loud Tour, Cole shot the music video for "Can't Get Enough" with Songz and Rihanna, who provided a cameo appearance. The video, directed by Clifton Bell, was released on September 14, 2011. In addition, early on September 25, two days before his album's release, Cole released the music video for the iTunes bonus track "Daddy's Little Girl".

Cole World: The Sideline Story was released September 27, 2011, debuting at number one on the US Billboard 200 chart, with 218,000 copies in its first-week of sales. , the album was certified gold by the Recording Industry Association of America (RIAA) for shipments and sales of 500,000 copies. On February 7, 2012, the third and final single from Cole's debut album was released. The song, titled "Nobody's Perfect", features renowned female rapper Missy Elliott, marking her return to music. , the album had sold 855,000 copies in the United States.

On October 24, 2011, during an interview with Hot 106's Rise & Grind morning show, Cole revealed he had begun working on his second studio album, with hopes of releasing it in June 2012. He also stated that the album would consist of songs that failed to make his debut, saying "I don't know how many, but I got songs that didn't make the last album that are automatically going to make this one," he said, revealing the release date: "June. End of June, maybe June." From November 6 to 8, Cole served as the supporting act for Tinie Tempah, appearing at Bournemouth International Centre; Liverpool Echo Arena, Motorpoint Arena Cardiff, Cardiff, Wales; LG Arena, Birmingham, England; SECC Arena, Glasgow, Scotland; and MEN Arena, Manchester.

2012–2013: Born Sinner and Truly Yours series

Cole was nominated for Best New Artist at the 2012 Grammy Awards. Cole played for the Eastern Team in the 2012 NBA All-Star Weekend Celebrity Game. On February 24, 2012, Cole reached two million followers on Twitter, and celebrated by releasing the song "Grew Up Fast." On March 1, 2012, Cole returned to his home town, Fayetteville, North Carolina. To celebrate his return, he released the song "Visionz of Home", and launched an event titled "Dreamville Weekend" to inspire the youth of his hometown to achieve great things. Cole performed for the first time in Africa during the Big Brother Africa 7 opening ceremony on May 6, 2012, alongside Camp Mulla, P-Square, Naeto C, Flavour N'abania, Davido, and Aemo E'Face.

On May 14, Cole announced that he was working on a collaborative album with Kendrick Lamar, saying in an interview with Bootleg Kev that "I just started working with Kendrick the other day. We got it in, finally, again. We got maybe four or five [songs] together", also saying that the project would be more focused on and eventually released once Born Sinner had been released. On July 26, he returned to Twitter after a 100-day absence and went on to reveal and release his new song, "The Cure", in which he hinted at a new album. On October 20, he announced at a live show that his second album was complete and that he was waiting until after Lamar released good kid, m.A.A.d city to reveal it.

On November 5, Cole revealed the title of his second album, Born Sinner, as well as a scheduled release date of January 28, 2013, via Ustream. On November 13, 2012, Cole released a promotional single for the album, titled "Miss America." Cole stated that he hoped "Miss America" would shift music in a different direction, adding that he knew it wouldn't be a big radio hit. He elaborated further, saying, "To me, 'Miss America' shifts things a little bit, it changes the conversation, it takes it in a more aggressive direction, more raw, more social commentary... Any type of commentary is good compared to what a normal single is these days. That's my aim, is to shift culture slightly, change the conversation. Nobody expects that for your first single."

On December 31, 2012, Cole revealed that Born Sinner would not be released on January 28, 2013, as previously expected. Cole said that he "needed a little more time than that to get things done."  In promotion of Born Sinner, Cole released an EP titled Truly Yours on February 12, 2013, the project consisted of five tracks Cole knew would not appear on Born Sinner. On February 14, 2013, he released the artwork for the first single via Instagram. "Power Trip" was released on February 14, 2013, marking Cole's second collaboration with R&B recording artist Miguel.

Cole had announced a release date of June 25, 2013, for Born Sinner. However, when it was announced that Kanye West's Yeezus would be released just one week earlier on June 18, Cole moved the release date of Born Sinner up a week in order to compete with West. He later commented, "This is art, and I can't compete against the Kanye West celebrity and the status that he's earned just from being a genius... But I can put my name in the hat and tell you that I think my album is great and you be the judge and you decide." Cole released the second installment in the Truly Yours series on April 30, 2013, the EP featured guest appearances from Bas, Young Jeezy and 2 Chainz. Born Sinner sold 297,000 copies in the United States in its first week of release, debuting at number two on the Billboard 200 chart, finishing approximately 30,000 copies short of Kanye West's Yeezus. He released three more singles in support of the album, "Crooked Smile" featuring TLC, "Forbidden Fruit" featuring Kendrick Lamar, and "She Knows". , the album had sold 796,000 copies in the United States.

2014–2016: 2014 Forest Hills Drive

On August 15, 2014, Cole released "Be Free" in response to the shooting of Michael Brown in Ferguson, Missouri. Three days later, he visited the city in order to meet with protesters and activists who were gathered at the site of his shooting, discussing the civil unrest that was taking place within the city. He performed the track with an additional verse at the Late Show with David Letterman on December 10.
On November 16, Cole released a video announcing that his third studio album, 2014 Forest Hills Drive, would be released on December 9. The video featured footage regarding the album's composition, as well as revealed that the album's name was derived from the address of Cole's childhood home. He announced that the album would include no lead singles and have little promotion, but was supported by four promotional singles; "Apparently", "Wet Dreamz", "No Role Modelz", and "Love Yourz". The album debuted at number one on the Billboard 200 upon release, selling 353,000 copies in its first week.

Cole announced the "Forest Hills Drive Tour" on February 13, 2015. The tour served as the backdrop for his first live album, Forest Hills Drive: Live. The album recorded during the Fayetteville shows of the tour, and was released on Cole's 31st birthday.
On March 31, 2014 Forest Hills Drive was certified platinum. , the album had sold 1.24 million copies in the United States. 2014 Forest Hills Drive won Top Rap Album at the 2015 Billboard Music Awards and Album of the Year at the 2015 BET Hip Hop Awards. The album was nominated at the 58th Annual Grammy Awards for Best Rap Album. The single "Apparently'" was also nominated for Best Rap Performance.

On December 15, 2015, Cole announced a documentary series titled J. Cole: Road to Homecoming, ahead of his HBO special Forest Hills Drive: Homecoming. The series included five episodes as well as featuring guest appearances from Kendrick Lamar, Wale, Rihanna, Pusha T, Big Sean, Jay Z, and Drake. All episodes were released weekly and were available for free on Vimeo until January 9. The concert film Forest Hills Drive: Homecoming aired on January 9, 2016, which was filmed during the final show of his Forest Hills Drive Tour at the Crown Coliseum in Fayetteville, North Carolina. On January 28, 2016, Cole released Forest Hills Drive: Live as well as the music video for "Love Yourz", from concert film.

2016–2017: 4 Your Eyez Only

On July 29, 2016, DJ Khaled released his ninth studio album, Major Key. Cole is featured on the track "Jermaine's Interlude". "Said all I could say, now I play with thoughts of retirement" is a direct quote from the track that caused some of Cole's fans to worry about him and his music career. In an interview with Genius, Doctur Dot of the Atlanta duo EarthGang explained that the song was originally a nine-minute posse cut, he said, "We were just trying to get Bas to fuck with the song, but Cole was like, 'I can't resist this beat,' so he hit the weed for the first time in a long time." "He overthinks on weed but we were in the garage smoking a blunt, the beat was running in the background. We stacked the hook up, we all had verses on it, it was a posse record and was like, nine verses long." On November 4, 2016, Cole performed at Jay Z and Beyoncé's Hillary Clinton Rally in Cleveland, Ohio, along with Big Sean and Chance the Rapper. On November 8, 2016, Spillage Village released the official version of "Jermaine's Interlude", called "Can't Call It". The song features Cole, EarthGang, Bas and JID.

On December 1, 2016, the artwork and a track list for Cole's fourth album, titled 4 Your Eyez Only, were shown on iTunes available for pre-order, with a release date for December 9, 2016. On December 2, 2016, Cole released a 40-minute documentary titled Eyez, on Tidal. It features behind-the-scenes footage of Cole and collaborators working on the album, including two music videos for the tracks "Everybody Dies" and "False Prophets"; neither song was included on the album. On December 5, "False Prophets" and "Everybody Dies" were released as singles to iTunes store and other streaming services. 4 Your Eyez Only debuted at number one on the Billboard 200 with 492,000 album-equivalent units, of which 363,000 were pure album sales, becoming Cole's fourth number one album. The track "Deja Vu" entered the US Billboard Hot 100 at number 7 without being released as a single, becoming J. Cole's highest charting song. All 10 songs from 4 Your Eyez Only debuted in the top 40 of the Hot 100, after only having four top 40 hits as a solo artist. "False Prophets" and "Everybody Dies" both charted also. Cole achieved twelve simultaneous Hot 100 entries in a single week. "Deja Vu" was released as the album's first single on January 10, 2017. On January 12, 2017, 4 Your Eyez Only was certified gold by the Recording Industry Association of America (RIAA). On April 7, 2017, the album was certified platinum by the Recording Industry Association of America (RIAA).

On January 16, 2017, Cole surprisingly released a track titled, "High for Hours" via his SoundCloud. The song was produced by Elite and Cam O'Bi. The song was released on the iTunes store as a single on January 18. Cole announced the 4 Your Eyez Only World Tour on February 21, 2017, the tour included 62 dates across North America, Europe and Australia. On March 24, 2017 HBO announced a documentary titled, J. Cole: 4 Your Eyez Only, the film aired April 15, 2017.
The film was directed by Cole and Scott Lazer. It is now available on YouTube.

2018: KOD 

On April 16, 2018, J. Cole announced a surprise free event for fans at the Gramercy Theatre in New York City. The event turned out to be a listening session for his forthcoming album, titled KOD, which was released on April 20, 2018. Cole held a second listening session in London the next day. The album's cover and tracklist show twelve tracks and two features, both by Cole's alter ego, Kill Edward. Cole had mentioned that KOD has 3 meanings, Kids on Drugs, King Overdosed, and Kill Our Demons. The cover art for KOD was done by a Detroit artist named Kamau Haroon who goes by the name Sixmau. The album touches on many topics including drug abuse, addiction, depression, and greed.

In the United States, on the day of its release, KOD broke the previous record for Views by Drake in 2016 by receiving 64.5 million streams on Apple Music. It accumulated 36.7 million streams on Spotify in its first 24 hours as well. Additionally, the titled track also surpassed Taylor Swift's "Look What You Made Me Do" by 0.4 million streams on its first day. The album debuted at number one on the US Billboard 200, earning 397,000 album-equivalent units, including 174,000 in pure sales, making it Cole's fifth number one album. J. Cole also became the first act to simultaneously debut three songs in the top 10 of the Billboard Hot 100, with "ATM" (at 6), "Kevin's Heart" (8), and "KOD" (10). The remainder of the album also debuted in the Hot 100, totaling to twelve songs on the chart. "KOD" was released as the album's first single, on May 8, 2018. Cole released music videos for the songs "ATM" and "Kevin's Heart", both of which were directed by Cole and Scott Lazer. "ATM" impacted US rhythmic contemporary radio on July 31, 2018, as the album's second single. Songs from the album were featured in the official 2018 NBA Playoffs and the NBA Finals promotion for ESPN. On April 27, 2018, it was announced that Cole was working on another project titled The Fall Off, Cole said that he planned to release The Fall Off before he recorded KOD. Cole also confirmed that he is working on a Kill Edward album. On May 14, 2018, KOD was certified Gold by the Recording Industry Association of America (RIAA) for sales of over 500,000 album-equivalent units in the US. The album has since been certified Platinum by the Recording Industry Association of America (RIAA) with one million album-equivalent units in the United States.

Cole announced the KOD Tour on May 8, 2018, Young Thug, Jaden Smith, EarthGang and Kill Edward served as the supporting acts. The tour will include 34 North American dates, starting in Miami, on August 9 and concluding in Boston, on October 10, 2018. Cole performed "Intro" and "Friends" at the 2018 BET Awards on June 24, 2018. Singer Daniel Caesar performed part of "Intro" and the chorus to "Friends", rapper Wale was also part of the set.

On August 7, 2018, Cole released a single titled, "Album of the Year (Freestyle)". The single was accompanied by a music video, which premiered on WorldStarHipHop. Cole also announced a new project titled, The Off Season, which he plans to release ahead of his next studio album, The Fall Off. In the description to the video, it reads: "The Off Season coming soon... All roads lead to The Fall Off - Cole". In an interview for Billboard in September 2018, Cole said he plans to take off 2019 from touring to finish work on The Off Season, The Fall Off, and the Kill Edward project.

2019: Revenge of the Dreamers III

On January 6, 2019, Cole took to Twitter to announce Dreamville's compilation album Revenge of the Dreamers III by uploading a gold poster-like invitation. Recording sessions took place in Atlanta beginning January 6 through January 16, 2019. Throughout the 10-days of recording, invitations were shared by the entire Dreamville roster, among other artists and producers outside of Dreamville. A total of 343 artists and producers were invited to the sessions including, Big K.R.I.T., Mike Will Made It, DJ Khaled, Swizz Beatz, Tay Keith, T.I, Rick Ross, 9th Wonder and Wale, among others. On January 23, 2019, Cole released his first lead single since 2013 titled, "Middle Child". With only one day of tracking, "Middle Child" debuted at number 26 on the US Billboard Hot 100. The following week, the song peaked at number 4, making it Cole's highest charting song. Cole performed at the 2019 NBA All-Star Game for its halftime show on February 17, 2019, in Charlotte. He performed "Middle Child", "A Lot", "ATM", "Love Yourz" and "No Role Modelz". On May 23, 2019, Cole was featured alongside American rapper and singer Travis Scott on American rapper Young Thug's single "The London", which would become the lead single from Thug's debut studio album, So Much Fun.

On June 12, 2019, the first of two sets of dual singles from Revenge of the Dreamers III were released: "Down Bad" featuring Cole, JID, Bas, EarthGang, and Young Nudy, and "Got Me" featuring Ari Lennox, Omen, Ty Dolla Sign, and Dreezy. On July 1, 2019, the second set of dual singles from the album were released: "LamboTruck" featuring Cozz, Reason, and Childish Major and "Costa Rica" featuring Bas, JID, Guapdad 4000, Reese Laflare, Jace, Mez, Smokepurpp, Buddy, and Ski Mask the Slump God. Dreamville announced the album's release date on the same day and was selling limited merchandise on July 1, related to the album. On July 2, 2019, Dreamville Presents: REVENGE was released on the label's official YouTube account, a film documenting the album's recording sessions in Atlanta.

Revenge of the Dreamers III debuted at number one on the US Billboard 200 with 115,000 album-equivalent units, of which 24,000 were pure album sales, earning Cole his sixth consecutive number-one album in the country. The album was certified Platinum by the Recording Industry Association of America (RIAA). The album was nominated for Best Rap Album at the 62nd Annual Grammy Awards, while "Middle Child" and "Down Bad" were nominated for Best Rap Performance. Cole's collaboration with 21 Savage "A Lot" received a Grammy Award for Best Rap Song, making this his first Grammy Award win.

2020–present: The Off-Season and The Fall Off 

On June 16, 2020, J. Cole released his first song of 2020, "Snow on tha Bluff", a politically-charged track released soon after the murder of George Floyd that led to disagreements with and criticism from Noname and other rappers. On July 23, 2020, Cole released a promotional EP titled Lewis Street featuring two new songs, "The Climb Back" and "Lion King on Ice". The former later appeared on The Off-Season.

On December 29, 2020, Cole took to Instagram to post a photo where he documented a list titled, "The Fall Off Era". On the list crossed out, was features and Revenge of the Dreamers III. Also listed, but not crossed out was two projects, The Off-Season and It's a Boy, which he announced would be released ahead of The Fall Off. The caption of the post read: "I still got some goals I gotta check off for' I scram..." On May 4, 2021, J. Cole officially revealed the release date and album artwork of The Off-Season, his sixth studio album. The album's lead single, "Interlude", was released on May 7.

The Off-Season was released on May 14, 2021. The album was co-executively produced by T-Minus and featured guest appearances from Morray, 21 Savage, Lil Baby, Bas, and 6LACK. It received positive reviews from critics and topped the US Billboard 200, selling 282,000 album-equivalent units in its first week, earning Cole his sixth consecutive number-one album in the country. Four songs from The Off-Season debuted in the top ten on the US Billboard Hot 100, with "My Life" (at 2), "Amari" (at 5), "Pride Is the Devil" (at 7), and "95 South" (at 8). "Interlude" debuted at number eight the previous week giving the album five top ten singles.

On September 21, 2021, J. Cole released a freestyle titled "Heaven's EP", remixing the beat of "Pipe Down" from Drake's Certified Lover Boy. On March 31, 2022, the song later appeared on the Dreamville compilation D-Day: A Gangsta Grillz Mixtape, with Cole also appearing on the songs "Stick" and "Freedom of Speech".

Basketball career
Cole played basketball at Terry Sanford High School in North Carolina. With an academic scholarship, he tried out as a walk-on at St. John's University and was one of 10 call-back players during his sophomore year. In 2012, Cole played for the Eastern Team during the NBA All-Star Weekend Celebrity Game. In 2013, Cole told Sports Illustrated, "Sports is where it started for me. It parallels my life. Rap is such a competitive thing. That's why I have to watch sports. I got to keep up. It's my life in just another form."

On July 20, 2020, Cole released an article for The Players' Tribune, writing about his goals after graduating college to eventually playing professional basketball saying "if I can blow up in the next three years, that means I'll only be 27. That still might give me enough time to train and pursue a professional basketball career. I'll work hard enough to go play overseas and then try to work my way to the NBA." On July 31, 2020, Cole released his debut signature shoe in collaboration with Puma called the PUMA RS-Dreamer. 
In August 2020, it was also reported by Master P that Cole was training to tryout for the NBA.

In September 2022, J. Cole was named as the cover athlete for NBA 2K23 on the Dreamer Edition, and was featured in the game as well as a character in the game's "MyCareer" mode. Cole said in a press release, "NBA 2K has long been a place to discover new musical talent through their game and continues to be a gold standard for showcasing all things basketball culture. It's been an amazing journey to not only appear on a cover of this year's game, but to be part of the MyCareer storyline, soundtrack and bring the Dreamer brand into NBA 2K."

Patriots Basketball Club (2021) 
On May 10, 2021, Cole signed a contract with the Rwanda-based Patriots Basketball Club in the Basketball Africa League. Cole was also featured on the cover of the American basketball magazine SLAM, for their May 2021 issue. Cole made his professional debut on May 16 against the Rivers Hoopers, finishing with three points, three rebounds and two assists in 17 minutes. In three games with the team, he scored five points, had three assists and five rebounds in 45 minutes of gameplay. He was only under contract for a minimum of three games. He left the team after playing the three games.

Scarborough Shooting Stars (2022) 
On May 19, 2022, Cole signed with the Scarborough Shooting Stars of the Canadian Elite Basketball League. On June 8, 2022, in a social media interview released by the Shooting Stars, it was announced that Cole would take an indefinite leave from the team to fulfill his concert tour commitments. In 4 games with the Shooting Stars, Cole averaged 2.4 points, 0.6 rebounds, and 0.4 assists, while shooting 50% from 3-point range.

Career statistics

BAL 

|-
| style="text-align:left;"|2021
| style="text-align:left;"|Patriots BBC
| 3 || 0 || 15.2 || .286 || .000 || 1.000 || 1.7 || 1.0 || .3 || .3 || 1.7

Artistic influences
Cole has cited several hip-hop artists as influencing his rapping style, including Tupac, Jay-Z, Eminem, Nas, and Andre 3000. He described in an interview with Steve Lobel, "Jay [Z] was a mentor before I ever signed to him." "I studied his moves that much. ... I got to go on tour with him and steal a lot of gems. That's how you supposed to do it. You're supposed to learn and take pieces from the greatest. So, Jay was my mentor before I ever signed to him. And now that I signed to him it's just a blessing to be able to hit him for advice and get that real 20 years of experience or however long he been in the game. It's priceless." "My favorite rapper was Pac," he said. "He was my favorite rapper before I even started rapping. Before I even thought of—It went from Michael Jackson, Bobby Brown as a kid and artists like that. Even Kool Moe Dee. Just the cool dude that I looked up to. And then one day my stepfather came home from—I don't know if he was back from Desert Storm. ... I remember him coming home with that first Pac album. With 'Brenda's Got a Baby'. It was 2Pacalypse Now. And since then—When I was too young to know what he was talking about, but it connected. Cause that's the thing about art. It's just truth. It's straight–Whatever you feel. So, even as a seven-year-old kid, eight-year-old kid I could hear Pac's early albums and feel the truth." Cole drew comparisons to Nas following the release of Friday Night Lights, stating that Nas served as the primary inspiration behind the creation of the mixtape. Cole later addressed their musical similarities on "Let Nas Down", a song written and composed due to his disparaging comments towards "Work Out". As a response to this record, Nas came out with the song "Made Nas Proud" shortly after.

In 2014, in an interview with Angie Martinez, Cole listed Tupac, The Notorious B.I.G., Nas and Jay-Z as his top four rappers of all time, with André 3000 and Eminem being a toss-up for fifth.

Controversies

Diddy
In August 2013, Cole and Diddy were reportedly involved in an altercation at a 2013 MTV Video Music Awards after party in New York City. Reports said the incident started when Diddy tried to confront rapper Kendrick Lamar over the "King of New York" claim in his "Control" verse. Diddy allegedly attempted to pour a drink on Lamar, and Cole intervened. The two started arguing and Cole and Diddy allegedly got into an altercation, which then led to problems between their respective crews. After a brief scuffle, both crews separated. Ibrahim Hamad, a close friend of Cole's and president of Dreamville Records took to Twitter to address the rumors saying: "The Internet is a crazy place you niggaz reporting shit with no facts, Cole ain't get thrown out no party and he damn sure aint get beat up", he continued saying, "Ain't gon go into details about last night but get the facts right first before you rush to report some shit for some extra blog clicks". A few months after the incident, Cole and Diddy allegedly squashed the beef when both were seen in a video promoting Revolt, joking about the incident.

Reactions to False Prophets
Upon the release of Eyez documentary in 2016, the songs "Everybody Dies" and "False Prophets" caused controversy within the hip hop community, as many assumed that "Everybody Dies" contained shots aimed at fellow rappers Lil Uzi Vert and Lil Yachty. During an interview with Los Angeles' radio station Power 106, Lil Yachty responded, saying: "I don't listen to J. Cole [but] I definitely listened to it [and] people said he was talking about me. He said 'Lil.' I'm not little. My name has 'Lil' in it but there's a lot of 'Lil' rappers. [It's] either me or Uzi. Honestly, I don't give a fuck." Lil Uzi Vert acknowledged the track, responding via Twitter on December 2, 2016, by simply tweeting, "Heard some beautiful shit today @JColeNC" People also argued that the first verse on "False Prophets" consisted of direct shots at rapper Kanye West, due to Cole's referencing to West's altering public perception by the media and fans; as well as Kanye's recent hospitalization. Many also presumed that the second verse was directed at rapper Wale, with Cole saying that despite Wale's fourth album receiving fairly positive critical and commercial success, Wale remains misunderstood and slighted by some of his peers. On December 3, Wale released a track, called "Groundhog Day" as a response to "False Prophets", and the pair were spotted together in Raleigh, North Carolina at a North Carolina State University basketball game later that day. Cole spoke on "False Prophets" in an interview with The New York Times, he said:

Lil Pump
In April 2018, rapper Lil Pump teased a song titled "Fuck J. Cole" produced by fellow rapper Smokepurpp. Media outlets and rappers speculated that the song "1985" from KOD was a response to the two, while Cole said in a Vulture interview that "It's really a 'shoe fits' situation—several people can wear that shoe." Lil Pump reacted to the song hours after the album's release via Instagram saying, "Wow, you get so much props. You dissed a 17 year old, lame ass jit." Later that day during a concert in Atlanta, Smokepurrp, along with his fans erupted in a chant of "Fuck J. Cole." According to Cole, the target of the song is more general. He said it takes aim at what he sees as the cartoon version of hip-hop, he explained: "If you exclude the top three rappers in the game, the most popping rappers all are exaggerated versions of black stereotypes. Extremely tatted up. Colorful hair. Flamboyant. Brand names. It's caricatures, and still the dominant representation of black people, on the most popular entertainment format for black people, period." On May 4, 2018, as Cole was performing at JMBLYA festival in Dallas, he performed "1985", cutting off the backing track so he could rap his verse a cappella. The crowd erupted in chants of "Fuck Lil Pump" and "Fuck 6ix9ine." Cole immediately shut down the chants telling the crowd, "Don't do that." Cole performed "1985" during his Rolling Loud Festival performance on May 11, 2018, in Miami. During the performance Lil Pump was seen dancing to the song near the stage. On May 25, after Rolling Loud, J. Cole and Lil Pump sat down for an hour-long interview indicating that a supposed beef between the two is over. Cole asked Pump about his "Fuck J. Cole" comments in his music and social media. Pump responds by claiming he had seen his fans commenting it on social media and didn't know why. "But now I kinda get it," he says. "We make different types of music, so people, like... People just like doing that shit." He continues, "It wasn't even serious... I fuck with your shit. It's hard."

Noname
In May 2020, in the midst of the George Floyd protests, rapper Noname made a tweet panning rappers who discussed the struggles of black people in their music but had yet to publicly speak out on social media regarding the protests or Black Lives Matter. The tweet read: "Poor black folks all over the country are putting their bodies on the line in protest for our collective safety and y’all favorite top selling rappers not even willing to put a tweet up. niggas whole discographies be about black plight and they no where to be found". Many assumed her tweet was aimed at Cole and Kendrick Lamar, both of whom had yet to post on social media about the protests at the time of her tweet. On June 16, 2020, Cole released a song titled, "Snow on tha Bluff" addressing an unnamed woman, assumed to be Noname, while also touching on police brutality and race relations during the George Floyd protests. Shortly after the song's release, NoName tweeted "QUEEN TONE!!!!!!", referencing a lyric from the song. She later deleted the tweet. Many other artists defended Noname, including Ari Lennox, who is signed to Cole's Dreamville label. Lennox thanked Noname "for giving af about us constantly and endlessly", saying she appreciates "everything you [Noname] put out to the world". Rapper Chance the Rapper, criticized Cole, calling the song "not constructive" and saying it "undermines all the work Noname has done". Cole eventually addressed backlash in a series of tweets, defending his statements in the song and encouraging listeners to follow Noname on social media. Two days after the release of "Snow on tha Bluff", Noname released "Song 33", in which she alluded to Cole writing about her in the wake of the protests, rapping: "I guess the ego hurt now / It's time to go to work, wow, look at him go / He really 'bout to write about me when the world is in smokes? When there's people in trees? When George was beggin' for his mother sayin' he couldn't breathe? He thought to write about me?". Cole acknowledged the track shortly after its release, sharing a link to the song on Twitter. Cole and Noname previously collaborated in 2015, on the song "Warm Enough" from Donnie Trumpet and The Social Experiment's Surf album.

Business ventures

Dreamville Records

During the composition of The Come Up, Cole started his own record label in early 2007 with current label president Ibrahim Hamad. Cole sought for an avenue to release his own music, while Hamad yearned to start a record label, prompting the two to team up to form Dreamville Records. The label is currently distributed by Interscope Records.

Cole, Omen, and Bas were the label's inaugural artists. The label houses artists including Cole, Omen, Bas, Cozz, Lute, Ari Lennox, JID, and duo EarthGang. In-house producers include Elite, Ron Gilmore, Cedric Brown, and Meez. Dreamville Records has released nine albums, with three certified platinum or higher by the Recording Industry Association of America (RIAA).

The Dreamville Foundation
In October 2011, Cole established The Dreamville Foundation, a 501(c)(3) non-profit organization. The Foundation says that it was "created to 'bridge the gap' between the worlds of opportunity and the urban youth" of Cole's hometown of Fayetteville, North Carolina. With volunteers, the Foundation conducts philanthropic activities, such as an annual "Back To School Supply Giveaway" to provide supplies to schoolchildren. The Foundation also launched a book club for young men and sponsored "The Nobody's Perfect Writing Contest and Mother's Day Brunch" for students. It sponsors an annual weekend of Fayetteville community events called the "Dreamville Weekend" that features a discussion with the Young Men's Book Club and Appreciation Dinner and a Career Day panel of African-American professionals in a variety of fields.

In 2014, Cole purchased his childhood home in Fayetteville, North Carolina, for $120,000 through the Dreamville Foundation. The home had been repossessed from his mother years earlier, while Jermaine was attending college in New York. His plan is to turn the house into a homestead for single mothers and their children to live rent-free.

Tidal
In March 2015, Project Panther, the business of Cole's mentor Jay-Z, acquired Aspiro, the owner of the music streaming service Tidal, for a reported $56 million. J. Cole is a minor shareholder of the service, along with 15 other artist stakeholders, including Kanye West, Usher, Alicia Keys, Beyoncé, Rihanna, Madonna, Daft Punk, deadmau5, and Nicki Minaj.

Dreamville Festival
On April 27, 2018, J. Cole announced the Dreamville Festival, the festival featuring local music, culture, food and art, and also include a mix of up-and-comers and national acts. It is expected to be an annual festival. However, in the wake of Hurricane Florence, the event was postponed from its original date. The festival was rescheduled and held at the historic Dorothea Dix Park in Raleigh, North Carolina on April 6, 2019. The lineup included all of Dreamville's artists as well as SZA, Big Sean, Nelly, 21 Savage, 6LACK, Davido, Teyana Taylor, Saba, Rapsody, and Mez. The Dreamville Festival plans to donate proceeds to the Dorothea Dix Park Convervancy and the Dreamville Foundation.

Fashion
In February 2020, J. Cole announced a multi-year footwear and apparel partnership with Puma as an ambassador for the brand. According to the global director of Puma, Cole is involved in product creation, marketing campaigns and cultural guidance. With the announcement, Puma and Cole released a short film for the reimagined "Sky Dreamer" shoes, which debuted during the 2020 NBA All-Star Game.

On July 31, 2020, PUMA and J. Cole released their debut collaboration shoe, the PUMA RS-Dreamer. Cole commented on the signature shoe saying: "Over the years, basketball shoes have progressed greatly in their level of technology and comfort but have strayed too far away from designs stylish enough for cultural relevancy. The Dreamer hopes to change that reality. The highest level of on-court performance meets the highest level of aesthetic design for daily wear. Once again, you can hoop in the same shoes you wore outside." The launch of the shoe coincided with the restart of the 2019–20 NBA season.

Personal life
In a January 2016 interview with director Ryan Coogler, Cole revealed that he was married. His wife, Melissa Heholt, who met Cole while they were students at St. John’s University, is the Executive Director of the Dreamville Foundation.  Also in a May 2018 interview with radio host Angie Martinez, Cole stated that he and his wife have a son together. In 2019, he publicly spoke about his son. On July 20, 2020, Cole revealed he has two children. Cole is dual citizen of Germany and United States.

Discography

Studio albums
 Cole World: The Sideline Story (2011)
 Born Sinner (2013)
 2014 Forest Hills Drive (2014)
 4 Your Eyez Only (2016)
 KOD (2018)
 The Off-Season (2021)
 The Fall Off (TBA)

Concert tours
Headlining
 Cole World... World Tour (2011)
 What Dreams May Come Tour (2013–14)
 Dollar & A Dream Tour (2013)
 Dollar & A Dream Tour 2014: The Warm Up (2014)
 Forest Hills Drive Tour (2015)
 Dollar & A Dream Tour III: Friday Night Lights (2015)
 4 Your Eyez Only World Tour (2017)
 KOD Tour (2018)

Co-headlining
 The Campus Consciousness Tour  (2012)
 Revenge of the Dreamers NYC Crawl  (2015)
 The Off-Season Tour  (2021)
Supporting act
 Jay-Z Fall Tour  (2009)
 Attention Deficit Tour  (2009)
 Loud Tour  (2011)
 Club Paradise Tour  (2012)
 Rapture Tour  (2014)

Filmography

Awards and nominations

References

External links

 
 J. Cole on MTV.com
 Basketball Africa League profile

 
1985 births
Living people
21st-century African-American male singers
21st-century American rappers
African-American basketball players
African-American male rappers
African-American male singer-songwriters
African-American record producers
American expatriate basketball people in Rwanda
American hip hop record producers
American hip hop singers
American men's basketball players
American music industry executives
American salespeople
Basketball players from North Carolina
Businesspeople from North Carolina
Columbia Records artists
Dreamville Records artists
Grammy Award winners
Grammy Award winners for rap music
Musicians from Fayetteville, North Carolina
Patriots BBC players
Rappers from North Carolina
Roc Nation artists
Scarborough Shooting Stars players
Shooting guards
Songwriters from North Carolina
Southern hip hop musicians
St. John's University (New York City) alumni
American expatriate basketball people in Canada